Valdir Raupp (born August 24, 1955) is a Brazilian politician. He has represented Rondônia in the Federal Senate since 2003. Previously, he was Governor of Rondônia from 1995 to 1999. He is a member of the Brazilian Democratic Movement Party.

References

Living people
1955 births
People from Santa Catarina (state)
Brazilian Democratic Movement politicians
Governors of Rondônia
Members of the Federal Senate (Brazil)
Rondônia politicians

Brazilian people of German descent